Paul Brendan Murray, (born 26 November 1947) is an Irish Dominican priest of the Catholic Church, poet, writer, and professor. 

Murray was born at Newcastle, County Down, in Northern Ireland. In 1966 he joined the Irish Dominican Province, and was ordained a priest in 1973. Since 1994 he has lived in Rome, Italy, where he teaches the literature of the mystical tradition at the Pontifical University of St. Thomas Aquinas, also known as the Angelicum. He holds a doctorate in English Literature from University College Dublin. In 2012 Rev. Prof. Murray was conferred with the STM degree from the Angelicum at a ceremony in St Mary's Priory, Tallaght, Dublin.

Bibliography

Prose 
 The Mysticism Debate (1977)
 T.S. Eliot and Mysticism: The Secret History of the Four Quartets (1991)
 A Journey with Jonah: The Spirituality of Bewilderment (2002)
 Preachers at Prayer (2003)
 The New Wine of Dominican Spirituality: A Drink Called Happiness (2003)
 "I Loved Jesus in the Night": Teresa of Calcutta, A Secret Revealed (2008)
 Door into the Sacred: A Meditation on the Hail Mary (2010)
 Praying with Confidence: Aquinas on the Lord's Prayer (2010)
 In the Grip of Light: The Dark and Bright Journey of Christian Contemplation (2012)
 Aquinas at Prayer: The Bible, Mysticism and Poetry (2013)
 Scars: Essays, Poems and Meditations on Affliction (2014)
 God's Spies: Michelangelo, Shakespeare and Other Poets of Vision (2019)
 Saint Catherine of Siena: Mystic of Fire, Preacher of Freedom (2020)

Poetry 
 Ritual Poems (1971)
 Rites and Meditations (1982)
 The Absent Fountain (1992)
 These Black Stars (2003)
 Stones and Stars (2013)

See also
Faber Book of Irish Verse - an anthology of Irish poetry which includes a poem by Murray
T. S. Eliot bibliography - see section titled Works on T.S Eliot
 List of writers of Northern Ireland

References

 Irish Poetry of Faith and Doubt:The Cold Heaven, p. 187,  ed. John F. Deane, Wolfhound Press, 1990.

Irish Catholic poets
People from County Down
1947 births
Living people
Irish Dominicans
Male poets from Northern Ireland
Male writers from Northern Ireland
21st-century writers from Northern Ireland
21st-century poets from Northern Ireland
20th-century Irish Roman Catholic priests
21st-century Irish Roman Catholic priests
Alumni of University College Dublin
Pontifical University of Saint Thomas Aquinas alumni
Academic staff of the Pontifical University of Saint Thomas Aquinas